Whitworth Valley F.C. is an English association football club.

History
The club competed in the North West Counties League during the 1980s.

References

football clubs in England
football clubs in Lancashire
North West Counties Football League clubs